Teriang, alt. Triang (Jawi: ترياڠ) is a town and a mukim in Bera District, southwestern Pahang, Malaysia.  
It is the largest settlement in the district.

Etymology
Its name was derived from Sungai Teriang (Triang River), a tributary of the Pahang River, the longest river in Peninsula Malaysia.

History

Triang's history could be traced back to the mid to late 19th century. The population then consisted mainly of indigenous Malays, living on subsistence farming as well as fishing in the Triang River.  

Following the migration of Chinese to SE Asia, the first Chinese began to arrive in Triang around 1900.  Initially most would have arrived either by the Triang River or by foot, until the establishment of a small train stop by the Federated Malay States Railway (FMSR, now KTM) on its eastern route in the early 1900s.  The FMSR's southernmost stop was in Singapore.  As the railway line headed up north it reached Gemas whereupon the line split into western and eastern routes.  The western route headed north west to Kuala Lumpur and eventually Perlis while the eastern route headed north east to Kelantan. 

The railway line was an important transportation link for the Peninsula to export its commodity produce, the most important of which were tin and rubber, through the Singapore port.  Those Chinese who arrived and settled in Triang mostly worked as rubber tappers, timber merchants, restaurant and coffee shop operators, general merchandise dealers, provision shop operators, while some also tried to make some income peddling food to passengers when trains stopped in Triang.  They were the main economic force and contributed substantially to Triang's growth.  Over time, Triang grew to a predominantly Chinese town, with an estimated population of several thousands by 1950.  During the Malayan Emergency in 1948–1960, to suppress the insurgency the British military forcibly moved many rural Chinese into tightly controlled New Villages.  The Emergency was officially declared over in 1960.  According to the most recent census in 2010 the Bera District had a population count of some 80,000.  Of these 45% were ethnic Chinese, and most were town dwellers residing in Triang town or New Villages.

Politics
Triang was part of Temerloh District until 1992, when the southern half was carved out as the new Bera District, named after the nearby Bera Lake. Triang continued to be part of Temerloh constituency of the Malaysian parliament until 2004.

Triang is now one of three constituencies of the Pahang State Legislative Assembly within the borders of the parliamentary constituency of Bera, the other two being Guai and Kemayan. The seat is currently held by Leong Yu Man of the DAP.

Ismail Sabri Yaakob, the current Prime Minister of Malaysia, is Member of Parliament of Bera.

Transportation

Triang is located on Federal Route 10 which connects Temerloh to Gemas in Negeri Sembilan. The small Triang railway station is on the KTM Intercity Eastern Sector.  The train only runs once a day, plying between Johor Baru in the south to Kelantan in the north.   There are also regular though infrequent coach services to nearby towns as well as to Kuala Lumpur, Kuantan and Johor Baru.

Life in Triang

Education

The first school in Triang was established in 1922, the Je Sin Primary School, when a group of volunteers got together to set up a place a learning for the growing children population.  Prior to this Triang had no public education facilities, and only a few families with able to afford to arrange for some modest home learning for their children.  Je Sin started with 22 students and used Chinese as the medium of teaching.  It used the premise of No. 21 Main Street (a shop house) to conduct classes.  In 1924 Je Sin was renamed the Triang Overseas Chinese Primary School, and it maintained a register with the Overseas Chinese Schools registry with the ROC Overseas Chinese Commission in Taiwan.   As the student population grew, in 1925 a certain Mr. Wong donated a half-acre land close to the town centre for a school campus.  Additional money to construct the school facilities came from fund-raising efforts spearheaded by the then principal Mr. Yue Tian.  The school’s initial facilities consisted of four classrooms and a school hall.

The school grew over time and expanded its facilities, with funds contributed mainly from the local community.  Its teaching syllabus also expanded to include both primary and secondary curriculums, and the school was renamed the Triang Overseas Chinese Primary & Secondary School in 1951.  In 1957 new government regulations required the school to be split into separate primary and secondary schools, and with many other expansions and transformations in the ensuing years, it has today become three separate schools in different locations: SJK(C) Triang 1 (National Type (Chinese) Triang 1), SJK(C) Triang 2 (National Type (Chinese) Triang 2), and SMJK Triang (National Type Secondary School), offering schooling from primary to lower secondary.  Since its founding in 1922, Jee Sin and its successors have educated the entire children population in the Triang and surrounding areas, thanks to the staff and local community’s hard work, as well as the invaluable financial contributions from the community.

References

Bera District
Mukims of Pahang
Towns in Pahang